San Juan, Puerto Rico, held an election for mayor on November 6, 1984. It was held as part of the 1984 Puerto Rican general election. It saw the election of Baltasar Corrada del Río, a member of the New Progressive Party.

Nominees
Baltasar Corrada del Río (New Progressive Party), resident commissioner of Puerto Rico
Luis Pío Sánchez Longo (Puerto Rican Independence Party)
Victoria Muñoz Mendoza (Popular Democratic Party)
Luis Batista Salas (Puerto Rican Renewal Party)

Results

References

1984
San Juan, Puerto Rico mayoral
San Juan, Puerto Rico